Samuel Hyde House is a building at 3726 East Madison Street in Seattle, United States listed in the National Register of Historic Places. The building, built in 1909–1910 for liquor magnate Samuel Hyde, housed the residence of the Russian consul-general from 1994–April 2018 when the US State Department evicted the consul-general following the White House ordered closure of Russia's Seattle consulate office.

The two-story brick house is fronted by a portico with Corinthian columns; there is a brick carriage house in back. It is believed that the grounds were laid out by the Olmsted Brothers. The Olmsteds played a prominent role in designing Seattle's system of parks and boulevards, and were responsible for landscaping the grounds of the 1909 Alaska–Yukon–Pacific Exposition on the campus of the University of Washington.

References

History of Seattle
Houses in Seattle
Houses on the National Register of Historic Places in Washington (state)
National Register of Historic Places in Seattle
Russia–United States relations
1910 establishments in Washington (state)
Houses completed in 1910
Neoclassical architecture in Washington (state)